Christianburg is an unincorporated community within Shelby County, Kentucky, United States. It was also known as Hinesville.

References

Unincorporated communities in Shelby County, Kentucky
Unincorporated communities in Kentucky